The name Georgia has been used for six tropical cyclones in the Northwestern Pacific Ocean.

Typhoon Georgia (1959) – made landfall in Japan and in Russia (then the Soviet Union)
Typhoon Georgia (1962) – passed east of Japan
Tropical Storm Georgia (1967) (12W, Luding)
Typhoon Georgia (1970) (17W, Pitang) – made landfall on Luzon and in China
Typhoon Georgia (1983) (Luding) – made landfall on Hainan and in Vietnam
Tropical Storm Georgia (1986) (Ruping) – crossed the Philippines and mad landfall in Vietnam

Pacific typhoon set index articles